Acmaeodera flavomarginata is a species of metallic wood-boring beetle in the family Buprestidae. It is found in Central America, North America, and South America.

References

Further reading

External links

 

flavormarginata
Articles created by Qbugbot
Beetles described in 1832